Bobby Kimball (born Robert Lund Kimball) is a former wide receiver in the National Football League. He was a member of the Green Bay Packers for two seasons.

References

People from Camarillo, California
Green Bay Packers players
American football wide receivers
Oklahoma Sooners football players
1957 births
Living people
Players of American football from California
Sportspeople from Ventura County, California